Homoiodorididae O'Donoghue, 1924, was considered in the past to be a taxonomic family of nudibranchs, marine gastropod molluscs in the order Opisthobranchia.

Genera
Genera that were placed within the family Homoiodorididae included:
 Dendrodoris  Ehrenberg, 1831  : now in the family Dendrodorididae
 Doriopsilla  Bergh, 1880  : now in the family Dendrodorididae
 Homoiodoris Bergh, 1904 : now in the family Dorididae

References
 
 Powell A. W. B., New Zealand Mollusca, William Collins Publishers Ltd, Auckland, New Zealand 1979 
 DiscoverLife
 The Seaslug Forum : species list

Obsolete gastropod taxa